Two Male Heads is an anonymous painting formerly attributed to Hieronymus Bosch. It is currently in the Museum Boijmans Van Beuningen in Rotterdam.

The work became part of the museum's collection via its founder's Frans Jacob Otto Boijmans' bequest in 1847.

References

Paintings by Hieronymus Bosch
Paintings in the collection of the Museum Boijmans Van Beuningen